Iziaslav II Mstislavich (c. 1096 – 13 November 1154), was the second son of Mstislav Vladimirovich (Prince of Novgorod) and Christina Ingesdotter of Sweden. He was baptized as Panteleimon. Iziaslav is considered to be progenitor of the Monomakhovychi Volhynian branch (senior branch).

Iziaslav held following offices Prince of Pereiaslav (1132), Prince of Turov (1132–1134), Prince of Rostov (1134– ), Prince of Volhynia (1134–1142), Pereyaslavl (1143–1145), Grand Prince of Kiev (Kyiv, 1146–1149 and 1151–1154).

The identity of his first wife is a daughter of Conrad III of Germany and his first wife Gertrude of Comburg her name was possibly "Agnes". She died in 1151. Their children were:
 Mstislav II of Kiev
 Yaroslav II of Kiev
 Yaropolk, Prince of Shumsk
 Vasylko (1151–1182), prince of Shumsk
 Evdokia, married Mieszko III the Old, High Duke of Poland. No primary sources confirmed parentage of Eudoxia.
 daughter, in 1143 married Prince of Drutsk Rogvold Rogvoldovich (see Principality of Drutsk)

Iziaslav's second wife was Rusudan (or Bagrationi) daughter of King Demetrius I of Georgia, but they were married for only a few months in 1154 before his death. After the death of her husband, she returned to Georgia.

References

1090s births
1154 deaths
Izyaslavichi family (Volhynia)
Princes of Pereyaslavl
Princes of Turov
Princes of Volhynia
Grand Princes of Kiev
12th-century princes in Kievan Rus'
Eastern Orthodox monarchs

Year of birth uncertain